Pat Hogan (9 November 1930 – 17 August 2017) was an Australian rules footballer who played with South Melbourne in the Victorian Football League (VFL).

Hogan won the 1951 Metropolitan Football League best and fairest award and the South Melbourne Districts Football Club best and fairest award, prior to being recruited by South Melbourne FC.

Brother of former South Melbourne footballers, Kevin Hogan and Frank Hogan.

Notes

External links 

2017 deaths
1930 births
Australian rules footballers from Victoria (Australia)
Sydney Swans players